The Henry County Courthouse, Jail, and Warden's House in New Castle, Kentucky was built in 1875.  It was designed by the McDonald Brothers in a mix of Italianate, Second Empire, and other styles.  It was listed on the National Register of Historic Places in 1977.	

It is a six-bay two-story brick building on a rusticated stone foundation.  A stone jail and brick jailer's house extend to the rear, making the overall plan T-shaped.

In 2016, the building was listed as a contributing building to the New Castle Historic Commercial District.

See also
 Marion County Jail and Jailor's House
 National Register of Historic Places listings in Henry County, Kentucky

References

Houses on the National Register of Historic Places in Kentucky
Italianate architecture in Kentucky
Second Empire architecture in Kentucky
Romanesque Revival architecture in Kentucky
Government buildings completed in 1875
National Register of Historic Places in Henry County, Kentucky
1875 establishments in Kentucky
County courthouses in Kentucky
Courthouses on the National Register of Historic Places in Kentucky
Jails on the National Register of Historic Places in Kentucky
Houses in Henry County, Kentucky
Individually listed contributing properties to historic districts on the National Register in Kentucky